The Geledi are a Somali clan that live predominantly in the environs of Afgooye city. They are a sub-clan of the Rahanweyn and led the Geledi sultanate during the late 17th to early 20th century. They are divided into two main lineage groups: the Tolweyne and the Yabadhaale.

History

Origins
The Geledi people like the other Rahanweyn are of true Somali stock and like the Darod claiming Arab lineage was a phenomenon. Aw Kalafow a descendant of Omar is stated to be the first to use the title Garad.

Ajuran Sultanate
The Geledi and their Wacdaan allies were under the rule of the Ajuran client Silcis. The grandfather of Ibrahim Adeer was an Ajuran general who inflicted a large defeat on invading Oromo at Lafagaale. Following the weakening of the Ajuran the two notable rebellions came from the Geledi and Hiraab with Ibrahim Adeer carving out his own sultanate and defeating the Silcis.

Geledi Sultanate

The new Geledi Sultanate rose to become a powerful state that ruled large parts of the Horn of Africa exerting heavy influence on the Banaadir coast and dominating trade on the Jubba and Shabelle rivers. The sultanate grew to encompass nearly all of the Rahanweyn under the reign of Mahamud Ibrahim reaching its apex under Yusuf Mahamud Ibrahim. The sultanate conducted foreign policy with neighbors on the Swahili Coast and was connected with rulers of southern Arabia. Facing two jihadist insurrections the state was able to defeat and resubjugate lost territory on its western frontier as a result of these wars. Ultimately failing to end a rebellion in the key city of Merca the sultanate declined steadily but still managed to fend off the Ethiopian Empire before the death of its last final ruler Osman Ahmed.

Modern
Following the end of the Sultanate and its incorporation into Italian Somaliland, the Somali Republic would soon be born in 1960. The Geledi people had gone from one of the most dominant subclans in all of Southern Somalia to humble farmers in the wake of illegal land grabbing and marginalization by the Somali government. Large scale movement into Afgooye by Somalis not native to the city and the grants of land traditionally reserved for Geledi cultivation caused significant tension in the community.

Culture

New Years celebrations in the town of Afgooye are well marked by the Geledi people and they continue until this day. With men and women donning traditional white cloth a man wielding a wooden trumpet or buun leads the people in procession. They are marked in certain lines behind the trumpeter and poets lead chants and people break into song. Like other Rahanweyn the Geledi speak the maay dialect but their close proximity to maaxa or standard Somali speakers has marked them.

Istunka Afgooye
The Istunka Afgooye or isgaraac is an annual stick fight performed in the city by its inhabitants stretching back hundreds of years. It first began in the Ajuran period but was later formalized with teams and rules by Geledi Sultan Ahmed Yusuf. The festival coincides with the harvest being a joyous time in the city The event itself consists of a mock fight between the people residing on each side of the river bed in the town of Afgooye. Symbolizing the defence of one's community and honor, it coincides with the start of the main harvest season. Istunka was originally performed in full combat gear, with battle-axes, swords and daggers. However, for safety reasons, performers later replaced those weapons with large sticks or batons.

Poetry

The Geledi retained their rich oral tradition and evocative poetry that differed from the more well known northern style. In southern Somalia the poet and reciter would be one and the same. British ethnologist Virginia Luling noted during her visit to the town that poetry was to be conceived and recited simultaneously with no prior preparation. The poets or Laashin relied on their wit and memory to construct beautiful poems and entertain the audience. It is important to note as the Geledi are Rahanweyn they speak Af Maay and not Af Maaha which is sometimes classified as a separate language from Af Maaha or the ubiquitously known 'Standard Somali'.

Geledi Laashins during Luling's 1989 stay in Afgooye sang about the ever present issue of land theft by the Somali government. The Sultan in these poems was asked to help the community and reminded of his legendary Gobroon forefathers of the centuries prior.

The poem The law then was not this law was performed by the leading Laashins of Afgooye, Hiraabey, Muuse Cusmaan and Abukar Cali Goitow alongside a few others, addressed to the current leader Sultan Subuge.

Here the richest selection of the poem performed by Goitow

References

Somali clans